Terra Avia is an airline based at Chișinău International Airport, in Chișinău, Moldova. It operates chartered passenger and cargo flights and aircraft leasing. It was founded in 2005. In April 2019, its AOC was temporarily suspended due to safety concerns.

Fleet
, the Terra Avia fleet consists of the following aircraft:

Reference 

Airlines of Moldova
Airlines established in 2005
Charter airlines